"Jingle Bells/U Can't Touch This" is a Crazy Frog cover of the Christmas song "Jingle Bells" and a cover of "U Can't Touch This", (originally by MC Hammer). In Australia, Belgium, France, the Netherlands, New Zealand, Spain, and Sweden, a cover of Wham!'s "Last Christmas" instead of "U Can't Touch This" was added as an A-side and issued as "Jingle Bells/Last Christmas".

"Jingle Bells/Last Christmas" was the more successful of the two versions, as it was released in late November 2005 to coincide with the Christmas holiday period. It peaked atop the charts of New Zealand and Spain and was also a top-five hit in Australia, Belgium, and France. In France, its 2005 sales were estimated to 84,367. "Jingle Bells/U Can't Touch This" was released in the British Isles instead, peaking at number five on the UK Singles Chart and number 11 in Ireland.

Music videos

"U Can't Touch This"

The video shows a shortened version of the events of Popcorn.

"Jingle Bells"
The video starts with the Crazy Frog playing in the snow with the bounty hunter robot from previous clips (in some clips, Crazy Frog's genitals are censored). It then shows flashbacks from clips of "Axel F," the Hall of Mirrors video, and the Crazy DJ clip, then more of the "Axel F" clip. The flashbacks end, and the bounty hunter robot begins to throw a snowball at the frog. But instead he kisses the bounty hunter robot, and his lips get stuck to him, until the robot pulls him off. They then make snow angels and a message reads "Have a ding dong Christmas, everyone!"

Track listings
UK
 "Jingle Bells" (radio mix)
 "U Can't Touch This" (video mix) - 2:04
 "Jingle Bells" (club vocal mix)
 "I Like To Move It" (club mix)
Enhanced Section:
 "Jingle Bells" (video)
 "U Can't Touch This" (video)
 "Jingle Bells" (U-MYX format)

Australia
 "Jingle Bells" - 2:37
 "Last Christmas" - 3:22
 "U Can't Touch This" - 3:17

France
 "Jingle Bells" (single mix) — 2:37
 "Jingle Bells" (new club mix) — 5:21
 "Jingle Bells" (new vocal mix) — 5:21
 "Last Christmas" (single mix) — 3:22

Charts
All entries charted as "Jingle Bells/Last Christmas", except where noted.

Weekly charts

Year-end charts

Certifications

Release history

References

2005 singles
Crazy Frog songs
Number-one singles in New Zealand
Number-one singles in Spain
Swedish Christmas songs
Warner Music Group singles